The Knerr Block, Floyd Block, McHench Building and Webster and Coe Building is a set of four buildings in Fargo, North Dakota that was listed on the National Register of Historic Places in 1983.
The four buildings were built in 1900, 1902, and 1910.  The oldest, the Webster and Coe building, was built in 1900 by a carpenter or contractor named Martel.   The McHench Building was designed by the Hancock Brothers architects. The "four adjacent buildings constitute a solid front of excellent early turn-of-the-century commercial structures, displaying a continuity of fenestration and decorative brickwork."

References

Commercial buildings on the National Register of Historic Places in North Dakota
Buildings and structures in Fargo, North Dakota
National Register of Historic Places in Cass County, North Dakota
Buildings and structures completed in 1910
1900 establishments in North Dakota